Pararheinheimera tangshanensis is a Gram-negative, aerobic, rod-shaped and motile bacterium from the genus of Pararheinheimera which has been isolated from the roots of a rice plants (Oryza sativa) from Luannan County in China.

References 

Chromatiales
Bacteria described in 2008